The 2011 American Handball Men's Youth Championships took place in Barquisimeto from May 1 – 5. It acts as the Pan American qualifying tournament for the 2011 Men's Youth World Handball Championship.

Teams

Preliminary round

Group A

Group B

Placement 5th–8th

7th/8th

5th/6th

Final round

Semifinals

Bronze medal match

Gold medal match

Final standing

Pan American Men's Youth Championship
Pan American Men's Youth Handball Championship
Pan American Men's Youth Handball Championship
Pan American Men's Youth Handball Championship